Anne Svingheim is a Norwegian ski-orienteering competitor. 

She won a silver medal in the relay event at the 1988 World Ski Orienteering Championships in Finland, together with Toril Hallan and Ragnhild Bratberg. At the 1990 World Championships in Sweden she won a silver medal in the relay together with Kristina Tollefsen and Ragnhild Bratberg.

References

Year of birth missing (living people)
Living people
Norwegian orienteers
Female orienteers
Ski-orienteers
20th-century Norwegian women